Finland maintains an embassy in India in New Delhi, and honorary consulates in Bangalore, Chennai, Kolkata and Mumbai. India has an embassy in Helsinki, that is also jointly accredited to Estonia.

History
Diplomatic relations between Finland and India were established on 10 September 1949. Shortly thereafter, Hugo Valvanne, Finland's first envoy to India arrived in New Delhi and presented his credentials to Governor-General C. Rajagopalachari. After India became a republic on 26 January 1950, Valvanne presented his credentials again to the first Indian President Rajendra Prasad in February 1950.

Finland's diplomatic presence in India operated from the Hotel Cecil from 1949 to 1951. Valvanne and his wife resided at the Hotel Cecil, while a double room in the nearby Hotel Maiden's housed Valvanne's secretary and the chancery. The Government of India sold the Government of Finland a plot of land  in Chanakyapuri (the diplomatic enclave of New Delhi) between the Swiss and the Swedish Embassies in 1954. Due to a shortage of funds, construction of the Finnish Embassy did not begin immediately. The Finland Embassy was located in a barrack at Humayun Road between 1951 and 1958. The barrack had been built in 1942 for temporary use during World War II. The Embassy moved to a location at Prithviraj Road between 1958 and 1967.

Finnish embassy in India
The Government of Finland organized a competition to design the new embassy building in the 1960s. Reima Pietilä and Raili Paatelainen won the competition. However, due to shortage of funds, and higher priority assigned to construct embassies in other countries, construction of a new embassy in Chanakyapuri was further delayed. The Government of India sent a note to the Finland Government in 1963 informing them that construction of the embassy was long overdue, and that the plot sold to the Finland Government had begun to attract anti-social elements to the diplomatic enclave. Further, the Swiss and Swedish embassies had complained that cobras were residing on the plot allotted to Finland. The Finnish embassy would move again from Prithviraj Road to Golf Links. It was located at 42 Golf Links from 1967 to 1979 and 25 Golf Links from 1979 to 1986. Finally, in the early 1980s, construction began on the embassy in Chanakypuri based on the design by Pietilä and Paatelainen. The Embassy in Chanakyapuri was opened on 5 December 1986.

Visits by heads of state
There have been several visits by heads of state and government, and other high-level officials between the countries. Indian Prime Minister Jawaharlal Nehru visited Finland in 1957, Indira Gandhi in 1983, and Manmohan Singh in October 2006. Indian President V.V. Giri visited in 1971, and R. Venkataraman in 1988.

From Finland, Prime Minister Sukselainen visited India in 1960, Kalevi Sorsa in 1984 and Matti Vanhanen in March 2006. President Kekkonen visited in 1965, Koivisto in 1987, and Martti Ahtisaari in 1996. Finnish heads of state and government have also visited India on private trips. These include Prime Minister Matti Vanhanen's visits to India in February 2008 and February 2010, and President Tarja Halonen's visits in January 2007, February 2009 and February 2012.

Trade
Bilateral trade between Finland and India totaled US$1.247 billion in 2014-15 and US$1.284 billion in 2016–17.

India's trade with Finland crossed $1 billion (USD) and is heavily in Finland's favour(approx 3:1). In 2016, Finland was India's 60th largest trade partner globally, and the 10th largest within the EU (Ministry of Commerce & Industry, Government of India 2017). Similarly in 2016, India was Finland's 23rd largest trade partner globally, and the fifth largest within Asia (Finnish Customs 2017).

Main export items from India to Finland: Electronic goods, mineral fuels and mineral oils, readymade garments, cotton including accessories, pharmaceuticals & fine chemicals, articles of iron and steel, machinery and instrument, coffee, rubber, iron and steel, organic chemicals and nuclear reactors, boilers, machinery and mechanical appliances and parts thereof.

Major exports from Finland to India: Electrical machinery and equipment, nuclear reactors, boilers, machinery and mechanical appliances, paper and paper board, iron and steel, pulp of wood or of other fibrous cellulosic material, pulp and waste paper, vehicles and transport equipment etc.

See also 
 Foreign relations of Finland 
 Foreign relations of India
 Indians in Finland
 India–European Union relations

References 

 
India
Bilateral relations of India